The 2008–09 National First Division was the 13th season of the National First Division, the second tier of South African soccer, and took place between 29 August 2008 and 2 May 2009. The champions were Jomo Cosmos, who were promoted to the South African Premier Division alongside play-off victors Mpumalanga Black Aces. FC AK and Durban Stars were relegated SAFA Second Division.

Inland stream

League table

Coastal stream

League table

Championship play-off

Source:

Promotion play-off

Semi-finals

Thanda Royal Zulu win on away goals.

Final

Source:

References

External links
South Africa 2008/09 at RSSSF

National First Division seasons
South Africa
2008–09 in South African soccer leagues